Binod Bihari Mahto Koyalanchal University is a state university located in Dhanbad, Jharkhand, India.

History
Binod Bihari Mahto Koyalanchal University, Dhanbad came into existence by the Jharkhand Government notification of 23 March 2017, published as Gazettes notification No. 216 (Extra Ordinary) dated 11 April 2017. The foundation stone of the university campus was laid on 13 November 2017 by the Chief Minister of Jharakhand, Raghubar Das.

Academics
The university offers undergraduate and postgraduate courses with 21 postgraduate departments, which includes the department of management, education, mass communication, art & Culture, law, foreign languages, life science, computer science, environmental science and disaster management.

Affiliated colleges
, the university has 10 constituent colleges, 20 affiliated colleges and 26 B.Ed. colleges spread in Bokaro and Dhanbad districts of Jharkhand.

See also
Education in India
List of institutions of higher education in Jharkhand

References

External links

Binod Bihari Mahto Koyalanchal University

 
2017 establishments in Jharkhand
Educational institutions established in 2017
State universities in Jharkhand